Time exposure may refer to:

 Long-exposure photography or time-exposure photography
 Time Exposure (Stanley Clarke album), 1984
 Time Exposure (Little River Band album), 1981
 Time Exposure the 1940 autobiography of US photographer William Henry Jackson (1843-1942)

See also
 Exposure  (disambiguation)